The Derbyshire moors are moorlands in the English county of Derbyshire, and form the southern part of the Peak District.

They include:

 Beeley Moor
 East Moor
 Brampton East Moor
 Gibbet Moor 
 Harewood Moor

References

External links 
 Morning on the Derbyshire Moors - a 1920 painting by Stanley Royle

Geography of Derbyshire
Peak District
Moorlands of England